Zofia Kowalewska (1853 Bakszty Małe - 1918 Minsk) was a Polish historical writer, folklorist, and social activist.

Life 

Zofia Kowalewska née Łętowski was born into a landowning family in 1853 in Bakszty Małe  in the Minsk Governorate. She married Eugeniusz Zawadzki from the Vilnius county . In her estate, where she spent most of her life, she conducted educational activities and secretly taught the Polish language and history of Poland. She perpetuated Polish culture among the local peasants and manors.

In her books, she described the aspirations and hopes of Poles during the January Uprising, and the life of Polish society in Minsk. She wrote books about the activities of insurgent organizations and the history of the insurgents of 1863.

Most of her books were published by Józef Zawadzki's bookshop in Vilnius. She was interested in peasant folklore and ethnography. She supported the Polish Society for Education and Charity in Minsk. She wrote articles and short stories in Kurier Litewski and Wisła.

She died in Minsk on February 22, 1918.

Works 

 Obrazki Mińskie 1850-1863, nakładem księgarnia Józefa Zawadzkiego w Wilnie, 1912
 Ze wspomnień wygnańca z roku 1863, nakładem księgarnia Józefa Zawadzkiego w Wilnie, 1912
 Z pamiętników doktora:powieść współczesna, nakładem księgarnia Józefa Zawadzkiego w Wilnie 1913
 Dzieje powstania lidzkiego: wspomnienie o Ludwiku Narbucie, nakładem Wyd. "Dziennika Wileńskiego" w Wilnie, 1934

References

Further reading 

 
 
 

1918 deaths
Polish writers
Polish historians
Polish ethnographers